KZZW (104.5 FM, "104.5 KZZW") is a radio station licensed to serve the community of Mooreland, Oklahoma. The station is owned by Brooke Deann Williams and airs a contemporary hit radio format.

The station was assigned the KZZW call letters by the Federal Communications Commission on March 13, 2012.

References

External links
 Official Website
 

ZZW
Radio stations established in 2012
2012 establishments in Oklahoma
Contemporary hit radio stations in the United States
Woodward County, Oklahoma